Christina Marie Burkenroad (born July 12, 1993) is an American professional soccer player who plays as a forward for Liga MX Femenil club CF Monterrey. In January 2016, she was drafted by the Orlando Pride in the National Women's Soccer League. Born and raised in the United States, she has dual Mexican-American citizenship and has been called up by the Mexico women's national team.

Early life and college career
Burkenroad was born in La Jolla, San Diego to William Burkenroad and Elizabeth Sandoval Noriega. She was only four years old when her mother died – her father suffered from depression and she became homeless for a time. Until Mission Bay High School she had only played soccer with boys clubs. She excelled in many sports and won a scholarship to California State University, Fullerton, Titans

Club career
She signed with the Orlando Pride on May 18, 2016, and appeared in 8 matches before being waived on June 21, 2017, to make room for returning forward Alex Morgan. She signed with IK Grand Bodø in Norway's Toppserien.

On February 6, 2018, Burkenroad joined Czech side Sparta Prague. Christina helped Sparta win their first Czech Women's First League title in five years and also 9th Czech Women's Cup. In the 2018–19 season Sparta won both competitions again. Due to the COVID-19 pandemic the 2019–20 Czech Women's First League was canceled and Burkenroad decided to not extend her contract.

On July 6, 2020, Burkenroad joined Liga MX Femenil club CF Monterrey.

Personal life
Until February 2023, Burkenroad was dating fellow soccer player Veronica Perez.

Notes

References

External links
 
 Christina Burkenroad at Cal State Fullerton
 
 
 Christina Burkenroad - YouTube Channel
 

1993 births
Living people
Citizens of Mexico through descent
Mexican women's footballers
Women's association football forwards
Toppserien players
AC Sparta Praha (women) players
Liga MX Femenil players
C.F. Monterrey (women) players
Mexican people of American descent
Mexican expatriate women's footballers
Mexican expatriate sportspeople in Norway
Expatriate women's footballers in Norway
Mexican expatriates in the Czech Republic
Expatriate women's footballers in the Czech Republic
LGBT association football players
Mexican LGBT sportspeople
American women's soccer players
Soccer players from San Diego
People from La Jolla, San Diego
American sportspeople of Mexican descent
Cal State Fullerton Titans women's soccer players
Orlando Pride draft picks
National Women's Soccer League players
Orlando Pride players
American expatriate women's soccer players
American expatriate sportspeople in the Czech Republic
American expatriate sportspeople in Norway
American LGBT sportspeople
LGBT people from California
LGBT Hispanic and Latino American people
Lesbian sportswomen
Czech Women's First League players
21st-century American LGBT people